Biogas is a mixture of gases, primarily consisting of methane, carbon dioxide and hydrogen sulphide, produced from raw materials such as agricultural waste, manure, municipal waste, plant material, sewage, green waste, wastewater, and food waste. It is a renewable energy source.

Biogas is produced by anaerobic digestion with anaerobic organisms or methanogen inside an anaerobic digester, biodigester or a bioreactor.

Biogas is primarily methane and carbon dioxide and may have small amounts of hydrogen sulfide, moisture and siloxanes. The gases methane, hydrogen, and carbon monoxide can be combusted or oxidized with oxygen. This energy release allows biogas to be used as a fuel; it can be used in fuel cells and for any heating purpose, such as cooking. It can also be used in a gas engine to convert the energy in the gas into electricity and heat.

Biogas can be compressed after removal of carbon dioxide and hydrogen sulphide, the same way as natural gas is compressed to CNG, and used to power motor vehicles. In the United Kingdom, for example, biogas is estimated to have the potential to replace around 17% of vehicle fuel. It qualifies for renewable energy subsidies in some parts of the world. Biogas can be cleaned and upgraded to natural gas standards, when it becomes bio-methane. Biogas is considered to be a renewable resource because its production-and-use cycle is continuous, and it generates no net carbon dioxide. As the organic material grows, it is converted and used. It then regrows in a continually repeating cycle. From a carbon perspective, as much carbon dioxide is absorbed from the atmosphere in the growth of the primary bio-resource as is released, when the material is ultimately converted to energy.

Production
Biogas is produced by microorganisms, such as methanogens and sulfate-reducing bacteria, performing anaerobic respiration. Biogas can refer to gas produced naturally and industrially.

Natural

In soil, methane is produced in anaerobic environments by methanogens, but is mostly consumed in aerobic zones by methanotrophs. Methane emissions result when the balance favors methanogens. Wetland soils are the main natural source of methane. Other sources include oceans, forest soils, termites, and wild ruminants.

Industrial

The purpose of industrial biogas production is the collection of biomethane, usually for fuel. Industrial biogas is produced either;
 As landfill gas (LFG), which is produced by the decomposition of biodegradable waste inside a landfill due to chemical reactions and microbes, or 
 As digested gas, produced inside an anaerobic digester.

Bio-gas Plants 
A biogas plant is the name often given to an anaerobic digester that treats farm wastes or energy crops. It can be produced using anaerobic digesters (air-tight tanks with different configurations). These plants can be fed with energy crops such as maize silage or biodegradable wastes including sewage sludge and food waste. During the process, the micro-organisms transform biomass waste into biogas (mainly methane and carbon dioxide) and digestate. Higher quantities of biogas can be produced when the wastewater is co-digested with other residuals from the dairy industry, sugar industry, or brewery industry. For example, while mixing 90% of wastewater from beer factory with 10% cow whey, the production of biogas was increased by 2.5 times compared to the biogas produced by wastewater from the brewery only.

Manufacturing of biogas from intentionally planted maize has been described as being unsustainable and harmful due to very concentrated, intense and soil eroding character of these plantations.

Key processes 
There are two key processes: mesophilic and thermophilic digestion which is dependent on temperature. In experimental work at University of Alaska Fairbanks, a 1000-litre digester using psychrophiles harvested from "mud from a frozen lake in Alaska" has produced 200–300 liters of methane per day, about 20–30% of the output from digesters in warmer climates.

Dangers 
The air pollution produced by biogas is similar to that of natural gas as when methane (a major constituent of biogas) is ignited for its usage as an energy source, Carbon dioxide is made as a product which is a greenhouse gas ( as described by this equation:  + 2 →  + 2 ). The content of toxic hydrogen sulfide presents additional risks and has been responsible for serious accidents. Leaks of unburned methane are an additional risk, because methane is a potent greenhouse gas. A facility may leak 2% of the methane.

Biogas can be explosive when mixed in the ratio of one part biogas to 8–20 parts air. Special safety precautions have to be taken for entering an empty biogas digester for maintenance work. It is important that a biogas system never has negative pressure as this could cause an explosion. Negative gas pressure can occur if too much gas is removed or leaked; Because of this biogas should not be used at pressures below one column inch of water, measured by a pressure gauge.

Frequent smell checks must be performed on a biogas system. If biogas is smelled anywhere windows and doors should be opened immediately. If there is a fire the gas should be shut off at the gate valve of the biogas system.

Landfill gas 

Landfill gas is produced by wet organic waste decomposing under anaerobic conditions in a similar way to biogas.

The waste is covered and mechanically compressed by the weight of the material that is deposited above. This material prevents oxygen exposure thus allowing anaerobic microbes to thrive. Biogas builds up and is slowly released into the atmosphere if the site has not been engineered to capture the gas. Landfill gas released in an uncontrolled way can be hazardous since it can become explosive when it escapes from the landfill and mixes with oxygen. The lower explosive limit is 5% methane and the upper is 15% methane.

The methane in biogas is 28 times more potent a greenhouse gas than carbon dioxide. Therefore, uncontained landfill gas, which escapes into the atmosphere may significantly contribute to the effects of global warming. In addition, volatile organic compounds (VOCs) in landfill gas contribute to the formation of photochemical smog.

Technical
Biochemical oxygen demand (BOD) is a measure of the amount of oxygen required by aerobic micro-organisms to decompose the organic matter in a sample of material being used in the biodigester as well as the BOD for the liquid discharge allows for the calculation of the daily energy output from a biodigester.

Another term related to biodigesters is effluent dirtiness, which tells how much organic material there is per unit of biogas source. Typical units for this measure are in mg BOD/litre. As an example, effluent dirtiness can range between 800 and 1200 mg BOD/litre in Panama.

From 1 kg of decommissioned kitchen bio-waste, 0.45 m3 of biogas can be obtained. The price for collecting biological waste from households is approximately €70 per ton.

Composition 

The composition of biogas varies depending upon the substrate composition, as well as the conditions within the anaerobic reactor (temperature, pH, and substrate concentration). Landfill gas typically has methane concentrations around 50%. Advanced waste treatment technologies can produce biogas with 55–75% methane, which for reactors with free liquids can be increased to 80–90% methane using in-situ gas purification techniques. As produced, biogas contains water vapor. The fractional volume of water vapor is a function of biogas temperature; correction of measured gas volume for water vapour content and thermal expansion is easily done via simple mathematics which yields the standardized volume of dry biogas.

For 1000 kg (wet weight) of input to a typical biodigester, total solids may be 30% of the wet weight while volatile suspended solids may be 90% of the total solids. Protein would be 20% of the volatile solids, carbohydrates would be 70% of the volatile solids, and finally fats would be 10% of the volatile solids.

Contaminants

Sulfur compounds 
Toxic and foul smelling Hydrogen sulfide is the most common contaminant in biogas, but other sulfur-containing compounds, such as thiols may be present. Left in the biogas stream, hydrogen sulfide is corrosive and when combusted yields sulfur dioxide and sulfuric acid, also corrosive and environmentally hazardous compounds.

Ammonia 
Ammonia is produced from organic compounds containing nitrogen, such as the amino acids in proteins. If not separated from the biogas, combustion results in  emissions.

Siloxanes 
In some cases, biogas contains siloxanes. They are formed from the anaerobic decomposition of materials commonly found in soaps and detergents. During combustion of biogas containing siloxanes, silicon is released and can combine with free oxygen or other elements in the combustion gas. Deposits are formed containing mostly silica or silicates and can contain calcium, sulfur, zinc, phosphorus. Such white mineral deposits accumulate to a surface thickness of several millimeters and must be removed by chemical or mechanical means.

Practical and cost-effective technologies to remove siloxanes and other biogas contaminants are available.

Benefits of manure derived biogas

High levels of methane are produced when manure is stored under anaerobic conditions. During storage and when manure has been applied to the land, nitrous oxide is also produced as a byproduct of the denitrification process. Nitrous oxide is 320 times more aggressive as a greenhouse gas than carbon dioxide and methane 25 times more than carbon dioxide
By converting cow manure into methane biogas via anaerobic digestion, the millions of cattle in the United States would be able to produce 100 billion kilowatt hours of electricity, enough to power millions of homes across the United States. In fact, one cow can produce enough manure in one day to generate 3 kilowatt hours of electricity; only 2.4 kilowatt hours of electricity are needed to power a single 100-watt light bulb for one day. Furthermore, by converting cattle manure into methane biogas instead of letting it decompose, global warming gases could be reduced by 99 million metric tons or 4%.

Applications

Biogas can be used for electricity production on sewage works, in a CHP gas engine, where the waste heat from the engine is conveniently used for heating the digester; cooking; space heating; water heating; and process heating. If compressed, it can replace compressed natural gas for use in vehicles, where it can fuel an internal combustion engine or fuel cells and is a much more effective displacer of carbon dioxide than the normal use in on-site CHP plants.

Biogas upgrading
Raw biogas produced from digestion is roughly 60% methane and 39%  with trace elements of : inadequate for use in machinery. The corrosive nature of  alone is enough to destroy the mechanisms.

Methane in biogas can be concentrated via a biogas upgrader to the same standards as fossil natural gas, which itself has to go through a cleaning process, and becomes biomethane. If the local gas network allows, the producer of the biogas may use their distribution networks. Gas must be very clean to reach pipeline quality and must be of the correct composition for the distribution network to accept. Carbon dioxide, water, hydrogen sulfide, and particulates must be removed if present.

There are four main methods of upgrading: water washing, pressure swing absorption, selexol absorption, and amine gas treating. In addition to these, the use of membrane separation technology for biogas upgrading is increasing, and there are already several plants operating in Europe and USA.

The most prevalent method is water washing where high pressure gas flows into a column where the carbon dioxide and other trace elements are scrubbed by cascading water running counter-flow to the gas. This arrangement could deliver 98% methane with manufacturers guaranteeing maximum 2% methane loss in the system. It takes roughly between 3% and 6% of the total energy output in gas to run a biogas upgrading system.

Biogas gas-grid injection
Gas-grid injection is the injection of biogas into the methane grid (natural gas grid). Until the breakthrough of micro combined heat and power two-thirds of all the energy produced by biogas power plants was lost (as heat). Using the grid to transport the gas to consumers, the energy can be used for on-site generation, resulting in a reduction of losses in the transportation of energy. Typical energy losses in natural gas transmission systems range from 1% to 2%; in electricity transmission they range from 5% to 8%.

Before being injected in the gas grid, biogas passes a cleaning process, during which it is upgraded to natural gas quality. During the cleaning process trace components harmful to the gas grid and the final users are removed.

Biogas in transport

If concentrated and compressed, it can be used in vehicle transportation. Compressed biogas is becoming widely used in Sweden, Switzerland, and Germany. A biogas-powered train, named Biogaståget Amanda (The Biogas Train Amanda), has been in service in Sweden since 2005. Biogas powers automobiles. In 1974, a British documentary film titled Sweet as a Nut detailed the biogas production process from pig manure and showed how it fueled a custom-adapted combustion engine. In 2007, an estimated 12,000 vehicles were being fueled with upgraded biogas worldwide, mostly in Europe.

Biogas is part of the wet gas and condensing gas (or air) category that includes mist or fog in the gas stream. The mist or fog is predominately water vapor that condenses on the sides of pipes or stacks throughout the gas flow. Biogas environments include wastewater digesters, landfills, and animal feeding operations (covered livestock lagoons).

Ultrasonic flow meters are one of the few devices capable of measuring in a biogas atmosphere. Most of thermal flow meters are unable to provide reliable data because the moisture causes steady high flow readings and continuous flow spiking, although there are single-point insertion thermal mass flow meters capable of accurately monitoring biogas flows with minimal pressure drop. They can handle moisture variations that occur in the flow stream because of daily and seasonal temperature fluctuations, and account for the moisture in the flow stream to produce a dry gas value.

Biogas generated heat/electricity 
Biogas can be used in different types of internal combustion engines, such as the Jenbacher or Caterpillar gas engines. Other internal combustion engines such as gas turbines are suitable for the conversion of biogas into both electricity and heat. The digestate is the remaining inorganic matter that was not transformed into biogas. It can be used as an agricultural fertiliser.

Biogas can be used as the fuel in the system of producing biogas from agricultural wastes and co-generating heat and electricity in a combined heat and power (CHP) plant. Unlike the other green energy such as wind and solar, the biogas can be quickly accessed on demand. The global warming potential can also be greatly reduced when using biogas as the fuel instead of fossil fuel.

However, the acidification and eutrophication potentials produced by biogas are 25 and 12 times higher respectively than fossil fuel alternatives. This impact can be reduced by using correct combination of feedstocks, covered storage for digesters and improved techniques for retrieving escaped material. Overall, the results still suggest that using biogas can lead to significant reduction in most impacts compared to fossil fuel alternative. The balance between environmental damage and green house gas emission should still be considered while implicating the system.

Technological advancements 
Projects such as NANOCLEAN are nowadays developing new ways to produce biogas more efficiently, using iron oxide nanoparticles in the processes of organic waste treatment. This process can triple the production of biogas.

Biogas and Sanitation 
Faecal Sludge is a product of onsite sanitation systems. Post collection and transportation, Faecal sludge can be treated with sewage in a conventional treatment plant, or otherwise it can be treated independently in a faecal sludge treatment plant. Faecal sludge can also be co-treated with organic solid waste in composting or in an anaerobic digestion system.  Biogas can be generated through anaerobic digestion in the treatment of faecal sludge.

The appropriate management of excreta and its valorisation through the production of biogas from faecal sludge helps mitigate the effects of poorly managed excreta such as waterborne diseases and water and environmental pollution.

Legislation

European Union
The European Union has legislation regarding waste management and landfill sites called the Landfill Directive.

Countries such as the United Kingdom and Germany now have legislation in force that provides farmers with long-term revenue and energy security.

The EU mandates that internal combustion engines with biogas have ample gas pressure to optimize combustion, and within the European Union ATEX centrifugal fan units built in accordance with the European directive 2014–34/EU (previously 94/9/EG) are obligatory. These centrifugal fan units, for example Combimac, Meidinger AG or Witt & Sohn AG are suitable for use in Zone 1 and 2 .

United States
The United States legislates against landfill gas as it contains VOCs. The United States Clean Air Act and Title 40 of the Code of Federal Regulations (CFR) requires landfill owners to estimate the quantity of non-methane organic compounds (NMOCs) emitted. If the estimated NMOC emissions exceeds 50 tonnes per year, the landfill owner is required to collect the gas and treat it to remove the entrained NMOCs. That usually means burning it.
Because of the remoteness of landfill sites, it is sometimes not economically feasible to produce electricity from the gas.

There are a variety of grants and loans the support the development of anaerobic digestor systems. The Rural Energy for American Program provides loan financing and grant funding for biogas systems, as does the Environmental Quality Incentives Program, Conservation Stewardship Program, and Conservation Loan Program.

Global developments

United States 
With the many benefits of biogas, it is starting to become a popular source of energy and is starting to be used in the United States more. In 2003, the United States consumed  of energy from "landfill gas", about 0.6% of the total U.S. natural gas consumption. Methane biogas derived from cow manure is being tested in the U.S. According to a 2008 study, collected by the Science and Children magazine, methane biogas from cow manure would be sufficient to produce 100 billion kilowatt hours enough to power millions of homes across America. Furthermore, methane biogas has been tested to prove that it can reduce 99 million metric tons of greenhouse gas emissions or about 4% of the greenhouse gases produced by the United States.

The number of farm-based digesters increased by 21% in 2021 according to the American Biogas Council. In Vermont biogas generated on dairy farms was included in the CVPS Cow Power program. The program was originally offered by Central Vermont Public Service Corporation as a voluntary tariff and now with a recent merger with Green Mountain Power is now the GMP Cow Power Program. Customers can elect to pay a premium on their electric bill, and that premium is passed directly to the farms in the program. In Sheldon, Vermont, Green Mountain Dairy has provided renewable energy as part of the Cow Power program. It started when the brothers who own the farm, Bill and Brian Rowell, wanted to address some of the manure management challenges faced by dairy farms, including manure odor, and nutrient availability for the crops they need to grow to feed the animals. They installed an anaerobic digester to process the cow and milking center waste from their 950 cows to produce renewable energy, a bedding to replace sawdust, and a plant-friendly fertilizer. The energy and environmental attributes are sold to the GMP Cow Power program. On average, the system run by the Rowells produces enough electricity to power 300 to 350 other homes. The generator capacity is about 300 kilowatts.

In Hereford, Texas, cow manure is being used to power an ethanol power plant. By switching to methane biogas, the ethanol power plant has saved 1000 barrels of oil a day. Over all, the power plant has reduced transportation costs and will be opening many more jobs for future power plants that will rely on biogas.

In Oakley, Kansas, an ethanol plant considered to be one of the largest biogas facilities in North America is using integrated manure utilization system (IMUS) to produce heat for its boilers by utilizing feedlot manure, municipal organics and ethanol plant waste. At full capacity the plant is expected to replace 90% of the fossil fuel used in the manufacturing process of ethanol and methanol.

In California, the Southern California Gas Company has advocated for mixing biogas into existing natural gas pipelines. However, California state officials have taken the position that biogas is "better used in hard-to-electrify sectors of the economy-- like aviation, heavy industry and long-haul trucking."

Europe 

The level of development varies greatly in Europe. While countries such as Germany, Austria and Sweden are fairly advanced in their use of biogas, there is a vast potential for this renewable energy source in the rest of the continent, especially in Eastern Europe. MT-Energie is a German biogas technology company operating in the field of renewable energies. Different legal frameworks, education schemes and the availability of technology are among the prime reasons behind this untapped potential. Another challenge for the further progression of biogas has been negative public perception.

In February 2009, the European Biogas Association (EBA) was founded in Brussels as a non-profit organisation to promote the deployment of sustainable biogas production and use in Europe. EBA's strategy defines three priorities: establish biogas as an important part of Europe's energy mix, promote source separation of household waste to increase the gas potential, and support the production of biomethane as vehicle fuel. In July 2013, it had 60 members from 24 countries across Europe.

UK 
, there are about 130 non-sewage biogas plants in the UK. Most are on-farm, and some larger facilities exist off-farm, which are taking food and consumer wastes.

On 5 October 2010, biogas was injected into the UK gas grid for the first time. Sewage from over 30,000 Oxfordshire homes is sent to Didcot sewage treatment works, where it is treated in an anaerobic digestor to produce biogas, which is then cleaned to provide gas for approximately 200 homes.

In 2015 the Green-Energy company Ecotricity announced their plans to build three grid-injecting digesters.

Italy 
In Italy the biogas industry first started in 2008, thanks to the introduction of advantageous feed tariffs. They were later replaced by feed-in premiums and the preference was given to by products and farming waste and leading to stagnation in biogas production and derived heat and electricity since 2012., in Italy there are more than 200 biogas plants with a production of about 1.2 GW

Germany 
Germany is Europe's biggest biogas producer and the market leader in biogas technology. In 2010 there were 5,905 biogas plants operating throughout the country: Lower Saxony, Bavaria, and the eastern federal states are the main regions. Most of these plants are employed as power plants. Usually the biogas plants are directly connected with a CHP which produces electric power by burning the bio methane. The electrical power is then fed into the public power grid. In 2010, the total installed electrical capacity of these power plants was 2,291 MW. The electricity supply was approximately 12.8 TWh, which is 12.6% of the total generated renewable electricity.

Biogas in Germany is primarily extracted by the co-fermentation of energy crops (called 'NawaRo', an abbreviation of nachwachsende Rohstoffe, German for renewable resources) mixed with manure. The main crop used is corn. Organic waste and industrial and agricultural residues such as waste from the food industry are also used for biogas generation. In this respect, biogas production in Germany differs significantly from the UK, where biogas generated from landfill sites is most common.

Biogas production in Germany has developed rapidly over the last 20 years. The main reason is the legally created frameworks. Government support of renewable energy started in 1991 with the Electricity Feed-in Act (StrEG). This law guaranteed the producers of energy from renewable sources the feed into the public power grid, thus the power companies were forced to take all produced energy from independent private producers of green energy. In 2000 the Electricity Feed-in Act was replaced by the Renewable Energy Sources Act (EEG). This law even guaranteed a fixed compensation for the produced electric power over 20 years. The amount of around 8¢/kWh gave farmers the opportunity to become energy suppliers and gain a further source of income.

The German agricultural biogas production was given a further push in 2004 by implementing the so-called NawaRo-Bonus. This is a special payment given for the use of renewable resources, that is, energy crops. In 2007 the German government stressed its intention to invest further effort and support in improving the renewable energy supply to provide an answer on growing climate challenges and increasing oil prices by the 'Integrated Climate and Energy Programme'.

This continual trend of renewable energy promotion induces a number of challenges facing the management and organisation of renewable energy supply that has also several impacts on the biogas production. The first challenge to be noticed is the high area-consuming of the biogas electric power supply. In 2011 energy crops for biogas production consumed an area of circa 800,000 ha in Germany. This high demand of agricultural areas generates new competitions with the food industries that did not exist hitherto. Moreover, new industries and markets were created in predominately rural regions entailing different new players with an economic, political and civil background. Their influence and acting has to be governed to gain all advantages this new source of energy is offering. Finally biogas will furthermore play an important role in the German renewable energy supply if good governance is focused.

Developing countries
Domestic biogas plants convert livestock manure and night soil into biogas and slurry, the fermented manure. This technology is feasible for small-holders with livestock producing 50 kg manure per day, an equivalent of about 6 pigs or 3 cows. This manure has to be collectable to mix it with water and feed it into the plant. Toilets can be connected. Another precondition is the temperature that affects the fermentation process. With an optimum at 36 C° the technology especially applies for those living in a (sub) tropical climate. This makes the technology for small holders in developing countries often suitable.

Depending on size and location, a typical brick made fixed dome biogas plant can be installed at the yard of a rural household with the investment between US$300 to $500 in Asian countries and up to $1400 in the African context. A high quality biogas plant needs minimum maintenance costs and can produce gas for at least 15–20 years without major problems and re-investments. For the user, biogas provides clean cooking energy, reduces indoor air pollution, and reduces the time needed for traditional biomass collection, especially for women and children. The slurry is a clean organic fertilizer that potentially increases agricultural productivity.

Energy is an important part of modern society and can serve as one of the most important indicators of socio-economic development. As much as there have been advancements in technology, even so, some three billion people, primarily in the rural areas of developing countries, continue to access their energy needs for cooking through traditional means by burning biomass resources like firewood, crop residues and animal dung in crude traditional stoves.

Domestic biogas technology is a proven and established technology in many parts of the world, especially Asia. Several countries in this region have embarked on large-scale programmes on domestic biogas, such as China and India.

The Netherlands Development Organisation, SNV, supports national programmes on domestic biogas that aim to establish commercial-viable domestic biogas sectors in which local companies market, install and service biogas plants for households. In Asia, SNV is working in Nepal, Vietnam, Bangladesh, Bhutan, Cambodia, Lao PDR, Pakistan and Indonesia, and in Africa; Rwanda, Senegal, Burkina Faso, Ethiopia, Tanzania, Uganda, Kenya, Benin and Cameroon.

In South Africa a prebuilt Biogas system is manufactured and sold. One key feature is that installation requires less skill and is quicker to install as the digester tank is premade plastic.

India 
Biogas in India has been traditionally based on dairy manure as feed stock and these "gobar" gas plants have been in operation for a long period of time, especially in rural India. In the last 2–3 decades, research organisations with a focus on rural energy security have enhanced the design of the systems resulting in newer efficient low cost designs such as the Deenabandhu model.

The Deenabandhu Model is a new biogas-production model popular in India. (Deenabandhu means "friend of the helpless".) The unit usually has a capacity of 2 to 3 cubic metres. It is constructed using bricks or by a ferrocement mixture. In India, the brick model costs slightly more than the ferrocement model; however, India's Ministry of New and Renewable Energy offers some subsidy per model constructed.

Biogas which is mainly methane/natural gas can also be used for generating protein rich cattle, poultry and fish feed in villages economically by cultivating Methylococcus capsulatus bacteria culture with tiny land and water foot print. The carbon dioxide gas produced as by product from these plants can be put to use in cheaper production of algae oil or spirulina from algaculture particularly in tropical countries like India which can displace the prime position of crude oil in near future. Union government of India is implementing many schemes to utilise productively the agro waste or biomass in rural areas to uplift rural economy and job potential. With these plants, the non-edible biomass or waste of edible biomass is converted in to high value products without any water pollution or green house gas (GHG) emissions.

LPG (Liquefied Petroleum Gas) is a key source of cooking fuel in urban India and its prices have been increasing along with the global fuel prices. Also the heavy subsidies provided by the successive governments in promoting LPG as a domestic cooking fuel has become a financial burden renewing the focus on biogas as a cooking fuel alternative in urban establishments. This has led to the development of prefabricated digester for modular deployments as compared to RCC and cement structures which take a longer duration to construct. Renewed focus on process technology like the Biourja process model has enhanced the stature of medium and large scale anaerobic digester in India as a potential alternative to LPG as primary cooking fuel.

In India, Nepal, Pakistan and Bangladesh biogas produced from the anaerobic digestion of manure in small-scale digestion facilities is called gobar gas; it is estimated that such facilities exist in over 2 million households in India, 50,000 in Bangladesh and thousands in Pakistan, particularly North Punjab, due to the thriving population of livestock. The digester is an airtight circular pit made of concrete with a pipe connection. The manure is directed to the pit, usually straight from the cattle shed. The pit is filled with a required quantity of wastewater. The gas pipe is connected to the kitchen fireplace through control valves. The combustion of this biogas has very little odour or smoke. Owing to simplicity in implementation and use of cheap raw materials in villages, it is one of the most environmentally sound energy sources for rural needs. One type of these system is the Sintex Digester. Some designs use vermiculture to further enhance the slurry produced by the biogas plant for use as compost.

In Pakistan, the Rural Support Programmes Network is running the Pakistan Domestic Biogas Programme which has installed 5,360 biogas plants and has trained in excess of 200 masons on the technology and aims to develop the Biogas Sector in Pakistan.

In Nepal, the government provides subsidies to build biogas plant at home.

China
The Chinese have experimented with the applications of biogas since 1958. Around 1970, China had installed 6,000,000 digesters in an effort to make agriculture more efficient. During the last few years, technology has met high growth rates. This seems to be the earliest developments in generating biogas from agricultural waste.

The rural biogas construction in China has shown an increased development trend. The exponential growth of energy supply caused by rapid economic development and severe haze condition in China have led biogas to become the better eco-friendly energy for the rural areas. In Qing county, Hebei Province, the technology of using crop straw as a main material to generate biogas is currently developing.

China had 26.5 million biogas plants, with an output of 10.5 billion cubic meter biogas until 2007. The annual biogas output has increased to 248 billion cubic meter in 2010. The Chinese government had supported and funded rural biogas projects, but only about 60% were operating normally. During the winter, the biogas production in northern regions of China is lower. This is caused by the lack of heat control technology for digesters thus the co-digestion of different feedstock failed to complete in the cold environment.

Zambia 
Lusaka, the capital city of Zambia, has two million inhabitants with over half of the population residing in peri-urban areas. The majority of this population use pit latrines as toilets generating approximately 22,680 tons of fecal sludge per annum. This sludge is inadequately managed: Over 60% of the generated faecal sludge remains within the residential environment thereby compromising both the environment and public health.

In the face of research work and implementation of biogas having started as early as in the 1980s, Zambia is lagging behind in the adoption and use of biogas in the sub-Saharan Africa. Animal manure and crop residues are required for the provision of energy for cooking and lighting. Inadequate funding, absence of policy, regulatory framework and strategies on biogas, unfavorable investor monetary policy, inadequate expertise, lack of awareness of the benefits of biogas technology among leaders, financial institutions and locals, resistance to change due cultural and traditions of the locals, high installation and maintenance costs of biogas digesters, inadequate research and development, improper management and lack of monitoring of installed digesters, complexity of the carbon market, lack of incentives and social equity are among the challenges that have impeded the acquiring and sustainable implementation of domestic biogas production in Zambia.

Associations 
 World Biogas Association (https://www.worldbiogasassociation.org/)
 American Biogas Council (https://americanbiogascouncil.org/)
 Canadian Biogas Association (https://www.biogasassociation.ca/)
 European Biogas Association
 German Biogas Association
 Indian Biogas Association

Society and culture 
In the 1985 Australian film Mad Max Beyond Thunderdome the post-apocalyptic settlement Barter town is powered by a central biogas system based upon a piggery. As well as providing electricity, methane is used to power Barter's vehicles.

"Cow Town", written in the early 1940s, discusses the travails of a city vastly built on cow manure and the hardships brought upon by the resulting methane biogas. Carter McCormick, an engineer from a town outside the city, is sent in to figure out a way to utilize this gas to help power, rather than suffocate, the city.

Contemporary biogas production provides new opportunities for skilled employment, drawing on the development of new technologies.

See also

Anaerobic digestion
Biochemical Oxygen Demand
Biodegradability
Bioenergy
Biofuel
Biohydrogen
Hydrogen economy
Landfill gas monitoring
Methanation
MSW/LFG (municipal solid waste and landfill gas)
Natural gas
Renewable energy
Renewable natural gas
Relative cost of electricity generated by different sources
Tables of European biogas utilisation
Thermal hydrolysis
Waste management
European Biomass Association

References

Further reading
 Updated Guidebook on Biogas Development. United Nations, New York, (1984) Energy Resources Development Series No. 27. p. 178, 30 cm.
 Book: Biogas from Waste and Renewable Resources. WILEY-VCH Verlag GmbH & Co. KGaA, (2008) Dieter Deublein and Angelika Steinhauser
 A Comparison between Shale Gas in China and Unconventional Fuel Development in the United States: Health, Water and Environmental Risks by Paolo Farah and Riccardo Tremolada. This is a paper presented at the Colloquium on Environmental Scholarship 2013 hosted by Vermont Law School (11 October 2013)
 
Woodhead Publishing Series. (2013). The Biogas Handbook: Science, Production and Applications. 
Lazenby, Ruthie (15 August 2022). "Rethinking Manure Biogas: Policy Considerations to Promote Equity and Protect the Climate and Environment" (PDF). Retrieved 19 October 2022.

External links
 
European Biogas Association
Biogas Portal on Energypedia
American Biogas Council
An Introduction to Biogas, University of Adelaide
Micro Biogas Production in Kenya
Indian Biogas Association
Listing of small scale domestic Biogas kits available by country
compact biogas plant and commercial biogas plantequipment 

Anaerobic digestion
Biofuels
Biodegradation
Biogas technology
Biomass
Biotechnology products
Biodegradable waste management
Fuel gas
Methane
Renewable energy
Sustainable energy
Waste management